The 1923–24 Campeonato de Portugal was the 3rd edition of Campeonato de Portugal. It was contested by 9 clubs, winners of regional championships, and took place from 18 May to 8 June 1924.

Sporting CP, the defending champions, did not qualify as they finished 2nd on Lisbon FA first division.

The winners were Olhanense, who defeated FC Porto by 4–2 in the final.

Format
The winners of nine regional championships were qualified to this competition: Algarve FA's, Braga FA's, Coimbra FA's, Lisbon FA's, Madeira FA's, Portalegre FA's, Porto FA's, Tomar FA's and Viana do Castelo FA's. This represents an increase in the number of clubs compared to the previous season, where the winners of Portalegre FA, Tomar FA and Viana do Castelo FA did not enter.

All matches are played on a single-leg, with extra time and penalties if necessary. While on the previous edition all matches were played at a neutral venue, in this new format only the final must be played at a neutral venue.

Teams

 Algarve FA winner: Olhanense
 Braga FA winner: S.C. Braga
 Coimbra FA winner: Académica
 Lisbon FA winner: Vitória de Setúbal
 Madeira FA winner: Marítimo

 Portalegre FA winner: Portalegrense
 Porto FA winner: FC Porto
 Tomar FA winner: Tomar
 Viana do Castelo FA winner: Vianense

First round

Second round

Semi-finals

Final

Bracket

See also
 1924 Campeonato de Portugal Final

References

External links
 thefinalball.com
 rsssf.com

Campeonato de Portugal (1922–1938)
Port
1923–24 in Portuguese football